Lactose is a disaccharide sugar synthesized by galactose and glucose subunits and has the molecular formula C12H22O11. Lactose makes up around 2–8% of milk (by mass). The compound is a white, water-soluble, non-hygroscopic solid with a mildly sweet taste. It is used in the food industry.

Structure and reactions

Lactose is a disaccharide derived from the condensation of galactose and glucose, which form a β-1→4 glycosidic linkage.  Its systematic name is β-D-galactopyranosyl-(1→4)-D-glucose. The glucose can be in either the α-pyranose form or the β-pyranose form, whereas the galactose can only have the β-pyranose form: hence α-lactose and β-lactose refer to the anomeric form of the glucopyranose ring alone.
Detection reactions for lactose are the Woehlk- and Fearon's test. Both can be easily used in school experiments to visualise the different lactose content of different dairy products such as whole milk, lactose free milk, yogurt, buttermilk, coffee creamer, sour cream, kefir etc.

Lactose is hydrolysed to glucose and galactose, isomerised in alkaline solution to lactulose, and catalytically hydrogenated to the corresponding polyhydric alcohol, lactitol.  Lactulose is a commercial product, used for treatment of constipation.

Occurrence and isolation
Lactose composes about 2–8% of milk by weight. Several million tons are produced annually as a by-product of the dairy industry.

Whey or milk plasma is the liquid remaining after milk is curdled and strained, for example in the production of cheese. Whey is made up of 6.5% solids, of which 4.8% is lactose, which is purified by crystallisation. Industrially, lactose is produced from whey permeate – that is whey filtrated for all major proteins. The protein fraction is used in infant nutrition and sports nutrition while the permeate can be evaporated to 60–65% solids and crystallized while cooling. Lactose can also be isolated by dilution of whey with ethanol.

Dairy products such as yogurt and cheese contain very little lactose. This is because the bacteria used to make these products breaks down lactose through the use of lactase.

Metabolism

Infant mammals nurse on their mothers to drink milk, which is rich in lactose. The intestinal villi secrete the enzyme lactase (β-D-galactosidase) to digest it. This enzyme cleaves the lactose molecule into its two subunits, the simple sugars glucose and galactose, which can be absorbed. Since lactose occurs mostly in milk, in most mammals, the production of lactase gradually decreases with maturity due to genetic predispositions.

Many people with ancestry in Europe, West Asia, South Asia, the Sahel belt in West Africa, East Africa and a few other parts of Central Africa maintain lactase production into adulthood.  In many of these areas, milk from mammals such as cattle, goats, and sheep is used as a large source of food. Hence, it was in these regions that genes for lifelong lactase production first evolved. The genes of adult lactose tolerance have evolved independently in various ethnic groups. By descent, more than 70% of western Europeans can digest lactose as adults, compared with less than 30% of people from areas of Africa, eastern and south-eastern Asia and Oceania. In people who are lactose intolerant, lactose is not broken down and provides food for gas-producing gut flora, which can lead to diarrhea, bloating, flatulence, and other gastrointestinal symptoms.

Biological properties
The sweetness of lactose is 0.2 to 0.4, relative to 1.0 for sucrose. For comparison, the sweetness of glucose is 0.6 to 0.7, of fructose is 1.3, of galactose is 0.5 to 0.7, of maltose is 0.4 to 0.5, of sorbose is 0.4, and of xylose is 0.6 to 0.7.

When lactose is completely digested in the small intestine, its caloric value is 4 kcal/g, or the same as that of other carbohydrates. However, lactose is not always fully digested in the small intestine. Depending on ingested dose, combination with meals (either solid or liquid), and lactase activity in the intestines, the caloric value of lactose ranges from 2 to 4 kcal/g. Undigested lactose acts as dietary fiber. It also has positive effects on absorption of minerals, such as calcium and magnesium.

The glycemic index of lactose is 46 to 65. For comparison, the glycemic index of glucose is 100 to 138, of sucrose is 68 to 92, of maltose is 105, and of fructose is 19 to 27.

Lactose has relatively low cariogenicity among sugars. This is because it is not a substrate for dental plaque formation and it is not rapidly fermented by oral bacteria. The buffering capacity of milk also reduces the cariogenicity of lactose.

Applications
Its mild flavor and easy handling properties have led to its use as a carrier and stabiliser of aromas and pharmaceutical products. Lactose is not added directly to many foods, because its solubility is less than that of other sugars commonly used in food. Infant formula is a notable exception, where the addition of lactose is necessary to match the composition of human milk.

Lactose is not fermented by most yeast during brewing, which may be used to advantage. For example, lactose may be used to sweeten stout beer; the resulting beer is usually called a milk stout or a cream stout.

Yeast belonging to the genus Kluyveromyces have a unique industrial application as they are capable of fermenting lactose for ethanol production. Surplus lactose from the whey by-product of dairy operations is a potential source of alternative energy.

Another significant lactose use is in the pharmaceutical industry. Lactose is added to tablet and capsule drug products as an ingredient because of its physical and functional properties. For similar reasons it can be used to dilute illicit drugs such as cocaine or heroin.

History
The first crude isolation of lactose, by Italian physician Fabrizio Bartoletti (1576–1630), was published in 1633.  In 1700, the Venetian pharmacist Lodovico Testi (1640–1707) published a booklet of testimonials to the power of milk sugar (saccharum lactis) to relieve, among other ailments, the symptoms of arthritis.  In 1715, Testi's procedure for making milk sugar was published by Antonio Vallisneri.  Lactose was identified as a sugar in 1780 by Carl Wilhelm Scheele.

In 1812, Heinrich Vogel (1778–1867) recognized that glucose was a product of hydrolyzing lactose.  In 1856, Louis Pasteur crystallized the other component of lactose, galactose.  By 1894, Emil Fischer had established the configurations of the component sugars.

Lactose was named by the French chemist Jean Baptiste André Dumas (1800–1884) in 1843. In 1856, Louis Pasteur named galactose "lactose". In 1860, Marcellin Berthelot renamed it "galactose", and transferred the name "lactose" to what is now called lactose. It has a formula of C12H22O11 and the hydrate formula C12H22O11·H2O, making it an isomer of sucrose.

Concentration of lactose in Dairy Products 
The lactose content of dairy products can vary depending on the type of product and the specific brand or variety. Here are some approximate lactose content ranges for common dairy products:

 Milk: 4-5% lactose
 Yogurt: 4-5% lactose (although some yogurts may be lower in lactose due to bacterial fermentation)
 Cheese: 0.1-3% lactose (hard cheeses like cheddar and Parmesan tend to have lower lactose content, while soft cheeses like brie and feta may have higher lactose content)
 Ice cream: 3-6% lactose (although some ice cream may be lower in lactose due to added sugars and other ingredients)

See also
Lac operon
Lactic acid
Lactose intolerance
Nectar
Sugars in wine

References

External links

Disaccharides
Excipients
Sugars